Presbyopia is physiological insufficiency of accommodation associated with the aging of the eye that results in progressively worsening ability to focus clearly on close objects. Also known as age-related farsightedness (or age-related long sight in the UK), it affects many adults over the age of 40. A common sign of presbyopia is difficulty reading small print which results in having to hold reading material farther away.  Other symptoms associated can be headaches and eyestrain. Different people will have different degrees of problems. Other types of refractive errors may exist at the same time as presbyopia.  This condition is similar to hypermetropia or far-sightedness which starts in childhood and exhibits similar symptoms of blur in the vision for close objects.

Presbyopia is a typical part of the aging process. It occurs due to age related changes in the lens (decreased elasticity and increased hardness) and ciliary muscle (decreased strength and ability to move the lens), causing the eye to focus right behind rather than on the retina when looking at close objects. It is a type of refractive error along with nearsightedness, farsightedness, and astigmatism. Diagnosis is by an eye examination.

Presbyopia can be corrected using glasses, contact lenses, multifocal intraocular lenses, or LASIK (presbyLASIK) surgery. The most common treatment is glass correction using appropriate convex lens. Glasses used to correct presbyopia may be simple reading glasses, bifocals, trifocals, or progressive lens.

People over 40 are at risk for developing presbyopia and all people become affected to some degree. Around 25% of people (1.8 billion globally) are currently affected.

Signs and symptoms
The first symptoms most people notice are difficulty reading fine print, particularly in low light conditions, eyestrain when reading for long periods, blurring of near objects or temporarily blurred vision when changing the viewing distance. Many extreme presbyopes complain that their arms have become "too short" to hold reading material at a comfortable distance.

Presbyopia, like other focal imperfections, becomes less noticeable in bright sunlight when the pupil becomes smaller. As with any lens, increasing the focal ratio of the lens increases depth of field by reducing the level of blur of out-of-focus objects (compare the effect of aperture on depth of field in photography).

The onset of presbyopia varies among those with certain professions and those with miotic pupils. In particular, farmers and homemakers seek correction later, whereas service workers and construction workers seek correction earlier. Scuba divers with interest in underwater photography may notice presbyopic changes while diving before they recognize the symptoms in their normal routines due to the near focus in low light conditions.

Interaction with myopia
People with low near-sightedness can read comfortably without eyeglasses or contact lenses even after age forty, but higher myopes might require two pairs of glasses (one for distance, one for near), bifocal, or progressive lenses. However, their myopia does not disappear and the long-distance visual challenges remain. Myopes considering refractive surgery are advised that surgically correcting their nearsightedness may be a disadvantage after age forty, when the eyes become presbyopic and lose their ability to accommodate or change focus, because they will then need to use glasses for reading. Myopes with low astigmatism find near vision better, though not perfect, without glasses or contact lenses when presbyopia sets in, but the more astigmatism, the poorer the uncorrected near vision.

A surgical technique offered is to create a "reading eye" and a "distance vision eye", a technique commonly used in contact lens practice, known as monovision. Monovision can be created with contact lenses, so candidates for this procedure can determine if they are prepared to have their corneas reshaped by surgery to cause this effect permanently.

Mechanism

The cause of presbyopia is lens hardening by decreasing levels of -crystallin, a process which may be sped up by higher temperatures. It results in a near point greater than 25 cm (or equivalently, less than 4 diopters).

In optics, the closest point at which an object can be brought into focus by the eye is called the eye's near point. A standard near point distance of 25 cm is typically assumed in the design of optical instruments, and in characterizing optical devices such as magnifying glasses.

There is some confusion over how the focusing mechanism of the eye works. In the 1977 book, Eye and Brain, for example, the lens is said to be suspended by a membrane, the 'zonula', which holds it under tension. The tension is released, by contraction of the ciliary muscle, to allow the lens to become more round, for close vision. This implies the ciliary muscle, which is outside the zonula, must be circumferential, contracting like a sphincter, to slacken the tension of the zonula pulling outwards on the lens. This is consistent with the fact that our eyes seem to be in the 'relaxed' state when focusing at infinity, and also explains why no amount of effort seems to enable a myopic person to see farther away.

The ability to focus on near objects declines throughout life, from an accommodation of about 20 dioptres (ability to focus at 50 mm away) in a child, to 10 dioptres at age 25 (100 mm), and levels off at 0.5 to 1 dioptre at age 60 (ability to focus down to 1–2 meters only). The expected, maximum, and minimum amplitudes of accommodation in diopters (D) for a corrected patient of a given age can be estimated using Hofstetter's formulas: expected amplitude (D) = 18.5 - 0.3 × (age in years), maximum amplitude (D) = 25 - 0.4 × (age in years), minimum amplitude (D) = 15 - 0.25 × (age in years).

Diagnosis
A basic eye exam, which includes a refraction assessment and an eye health exam, is used to diagnose presbyopia.

Treatment
In the visual system, images captured by the eye are translated into electric signals that are transmitted to the brain where they are interpreted. As such, in order to overcome presbyopia, two main components of the visual system can be addressed: image capturing by the optical system of the eye and image processing in the brain.

Image capturing in the eye
Solutions for presbyopia have advanced significantly in recent years due to widened availability of optometry care and over-the-counter vision correction options.

Corrective lenses
Corrective lenses provide vision correction over a range as high as +4.0 diopters. People with presbyopia require a convex lens for reading glasses; specialized preparations of convex lenses usually require the services of an optometrist.

Contact lenses can also be used to correct the focusing loss that comes along with presbyopia. Multifocal contact lenses can be used to correct vision for both the near and the far. Some people choose contact lenses to correct one eye for near and one eye for far with a method called monovision.

Surgery

Refractive surgery has been done to create multifocal corneas. PresbyLASIK, a type of multifocal corneal ablation LASIK procedure may be used to correct presbyopia. Results are, however, more variable and some people have a decrease in visual acuity. Concerns with refractive surgeries for presbyopia include people's eyes changing with time. Other side effects of multifocal corneal ablation include postoperative glare, halos, ghost images, and monocular diplopia.

Image processing in the brain
A number of studies have claimed improvements in near visual acuity by the use of training protocols based on perceptual learning and requiring the detection of briefly presented low-contrast Gabor stimuli; study participants with presbyopia were enabled to read smaller font sizes and to increase their reading speed.

Eye drops 
Pilocarpine, eye drops that constrict the pupil, has been approved by the FDA for presbyopia.

 Research on other drugs is in progress.  Eye drops intended to restore lens elasticity are also being investigated.

Etymology
The term is from Greek πρέσβυς presbys meaning "old" and ὤψ ōps meaning "sight" (GEN ὠπός ōpos).

History
The condition was mentioned as early as the writings of Aristotle in the 4th century BC. Glass lenses first came into use for the problem in the late 13th century.

See also 
 Vuity

References

External links 

 "Presbyopia" at MedLinePlus Medical Encyclopedia

Disorders of ocular muscles, binocular movement, accommodation and refraction
Wikipedia medicine articles ready to translate
Wikipedia neurology articles ready to translate
Disability by type

hr:Dalekovidnost